Miguel Acosta may refer to:
 Miguel Acosta (boxer) (born 1978), Venezuelan boxer
 Miguel Acosta (footballer, born 1972), Mexican football defender
 Miguel Acosta (footballer, born 1975) (Miguel Acosta Moreno), Mexican football manager and former player
 Miguel Acosta (footballer, born 1998) (Miguel Acosta Mateos), Spanish footballer